The 2011 Four Nations Tournament was the tenth edition of the Four Nations Tournament, an invitational women's football tournament held in China. The venue for this edition of the tournament was Yongchuan Olympic Sports Centre, in the city of Yongchuan.

Participants

Venues

Final standings

Match results

References 

2011 in women's association football
2011
2011 in Chinese football
2011 in Canadian women's soccer
2011 in Swedish women's football
2011 in American women's soccer
2011 in Chinese women's sport
January 2011 sports events in Asia